Wellington Road is a road on the north-side of Cork city. Wellington Road stretches almost a kilometre from St. Patricks Place (off St. Patricks Hill), to St. Lukes Cross at the eastern end of the road.

Historically, Wellington Road was a relatively affluent residential area with some large houses. At the eastern end of the street, some of the houses were associated with the nearby Victoria Barracks.  In the mid 20th century, many of the area's houses were sub-divided into offices or flats - a process that was somewhat reversed by the late 20th century.

There are a number of housing terraces on Wellington Road, including St. Patricks Terrace, Sidney Place, Montpellier Place, and Wellesley Terrace.

Cork's 96FM is located at St. Patricks Place at the western end of the road. It is also home to an Eir telephone exchange, a hostel, several bed and breakfasts, and a primary school.

Wellington Road lies in the Mayfield Garda Station policing catchment, and spans the St. Patrick's A, B, and C wards in the Cork North-Central constituency.

References

Streets in Cork (city)